The  was a Japanese Shinkansen high-speed train type which operated between 1985 and 2012 on the Tokaido Shinkansen and Sanyo Shinkansen high-speed lines. They were introduced after the 200 series trains, but their numbering is such because in the days of Japanese National Railways (JNR), Shinkansen types running east of Tokyo were given even numbers and those west of Tokyo odd numbers, hence they were given the next odd number in line after 0, 100. The last remaining examples of the type were withdrawn from service following the last runs on 16 March 2012.

Design

They differed visibly from the earlier 0 series in that the nose profile was more pointed. Another less obvious difference with the 16-car sets was that not all the cars were powered; the driving cars on each end were unpowered, as were the two bi-level centre cars. Some later production sets had powered driving cars and four unpowered bi-level trailers in the middle instead. The bi-level trailer cars contained a combination of restaurant cars, and first class compartments, or open-plan first class seating and first class compartments, or open-plan first class seating and refreshment cars.

The external livery was white (White No. 3) and blue (Blue No. 20).

Following their removal from front-line service, 100 series sets were later reformed into shorter four- and six-car sets for the slower Kodama services on the Sanyo Shinkansen line. These four- and six-car trains did not have bi-level cars.

Variants

Pre-series unit
Originally numbered X0, the pre-series set X1 was delivered in 1985, with test running commencing from 27 March that year. The X1 set entered revenue service for passenger evaluation trials on the Hikari services from 1 October 1985. This unit differed externally from later production units in having small windows aligned with each seating bay, and also had a slanting headlight arrangement. The type 116 Green (first class) car formed as car 10 initially included one two-seat and two single-seat compartments, but these were removed when the set was modified to full-production standard in 1986.

Set X0 was formed as shown below, with car 1 at the  end.

Set X1 was withdrawn in March 2000.

16-car X sets

Following passenger evaluation trials with the pre-series set X1, a total of seven X sets were built for use on Tokaido and Sanyo Shinkansen Hikari services. The first four production units entered service from 13 June 1986 as 12-car sets without bilevel trailer cars, numbered G1 to G4, and were used on Tokaido Kodama services until October in the same year. These sets were formed as shown below.

Cars 2, 4, 6, 8, and 10 were each fitted with cross-arm pantographs.

These units were subsequently renumbered as 16-car sets X2 to X5 with the inclusion of bilevel trailer cars, and were introduced on Hikari services from November 1986.

The noticeable difference over previous (0 series and 200 series) shinkansen designs was the inclusion of two bilevel trailer cars in the centre of the formation. The type 168 car had a restaurant area on the upper deck with kitchen facilities and a small buffet counter on the lower deck. The adjacent type 149 car provided private compartments for Green class passengers on the lower deck, with open-plan green car accommodation on the upper deck.

From March 1998, the X sets were redeployed to Tokaido Kodama services. The restaurant cars were no longer used, and fittings were subsequently removed. The fleet of X sets contained the oldest members of the 100 series fleet, and the first withdrawals started in August 1999. From the new timetable change of 2 October 1999, X sets were no longer assigned to regular workings, with the remaining examples subsequently limited to holiday period extra trains. The last remaining units were withdrawn by April 2000.

Formation
The 16-car X sets were formed as follows.

Cars 2, 6, and 12 were equipped with cross-arm pantographs. (The pantographs on cars 4, 10, and 14 were removed in 1995.)

16-car G sets

The G sets were officially classified as "100' series", and 50 units were built from 1988. They differed from the initial X sets in having a type 148 bilevel trailer car in place of the type 168 restaurant car. This had open-plan Green car accommodation on the upper deck, and a self-service cafeteria area on the lower deck. While originally used exclusively on Hikari services, in later years, these units were more commonly seen on Tokaido Kodama services. The last remaining sets owned by JR Central and JR-West were withdrawn in September 2003 before the start of the new Tokaido Shinkansen timetable the following October.

Formation
The 16-car G sets were formed as follows.

Cars 2, 6, and 12 were equipped with cross-arm pantographs.

16-car V sets (100-3000 series)

The nine V sets (also referred to as "100N") operated by JR-West included four bilevel trailer cars, which provided 2+2 standard class reserved seating accommodation on the lower decks, and restaurant and Green class accommodation on the upper decks. These sets originally ran under the marketing name Grand Hikari, but from May 2002 onwards were limited to use on the Sanyo Shinkansen only. The restaurant cars in these units were decommissioned from March 2000. Two V sets (V1, V6) were reformed as new 4-car P sets in 2000 to replace life-expired 0 series R sets on Sanyo Shinkansen Kodama services, and the remaining sets were subsequently used to donate cars as they were withdrawn. The last operational set, V2 (with four bilevel trailer cars from set V9), was withdrawn after being used on special Sayonara Grand Hikari runs in November 2002.

Formation
The 16-car V sets were formed as follows.

Cars 4, 6, 12, and 14 were equipped with cross-arm pantographs.

4-car P sets

The first of two reformed 4-car P sets was introduced on Sanyo Shinkansen Kodama services from October 2000. P1 was reformed from set V1, with the traction motors in the two end cars (renumbered in -5000 series) replaced by those from surplus JR-West G set cars. P2 was reformed from unit V6 in October 2000. Subsequent sets P3 and P4 were formed in 2001 by transplanting the cab sections of surplus non-powered G set cars onto powered intermediate cars renumbered into the 121-5050 and 122-5050 series. Set P1 was the first to be repainted into the new JR-West "fresh green" Kodama livery, in August 2002, and the entire fleet of twelve sets (P1–P12) had been similarly treated by March 2005.

Formation

Cars 2 and 4 were equipped with cross-arm pantographs.

Interior
The first three sets (P1 to P3) were refurbished in February and March 2002 with 2+2 abreast seating using former West Hikari seats. Sets from P4 onward (formed in August 2001) had 2+2 seating from the outset.

Set P2 was withdrawn on 9 February 2009, and moved to the JR-West training centre at Shimonoseki, where it replaced the former 0 series set Q3 as a static training set. P2's role as a training set ended in March 2013.

The last P sets in revenue service were withdrawn by 11 March 2011.

6-car K sets

The first six-car K set (K51) was formed in January 2002 for use on Sanyo Shinkansen Kodama services from February 2002. These sets feature 2+2 abreast seating throughout, utilizing former Green class seats from withdrawn 100 series cars. Sets started appearing in the new JR-West Kodama livery from August 2002, with all ten sets (K51–K60) similarly treated by August 2004.

Three K sets were returned to the original white/blue livery from July 2010. The first set treated, K53, was returned to traffic on 14 July 2010.

These sets were withdrawn from service on 16 March 2012.

Formation

Cars 2 and 6 were equipped with cross-arm pantographs.

Preserved examples
 123-1 (set X2) and 168-9001 (set X1) at the SCMaglev and Railway Park in Aichi Prefecture since March 2011.
 122-5003 (from set K54, formerly 122-3003 from set V3) preserved at the Kyoto Railway Museum, which opened in April 2016.
 168-3009 and 179-3009 (both from set V9) at Hakata General Depot in Fukuoka Prefecture

See also
List of high-speed trains

References

Further reading

 

Central Japan Railway Company
West Japan Railway Company
Shinkansen train series
Hitachi multiple units
Train-related introductions in 1985
Passenger trains running at least at 200 km/h in commercial operations
25 kV AC multiple units
Kawasaki multiple units
Kinki Sharyo multiple units
Nippon Sharyo multiple units
Tokyu Car multiple units